This is a complete list of short subjects and feature films that featured The Three Stooges released between 1930 and 1970.

Moe Howard, Larry Fine and Shemp Howard appeared in a single feature film with Ted Healy released by Fox Film Corporation entitled Soup to Nuts (1930). Shemp departed the act in 1932 to pursue a solo career and was replaced by his younger brother Curly Howard. This incarnation of the team appeared in several shorts and feature films with Healy at Metro-Goldwyn-Mayer in 1933 and 1934.
Moe and Shemp appeared without Larry or Healy in a 1929 Fox Movietone Newsreel.
Moe appeared without Larry, Curly, or Healy in the 1933 MGM PSA Give a Man a Job.
Moe and Curly appeared without Healy or Larry in the MGM feature film Broadway to Hollywood (1933).
Shemp appeared without the Stooges in the 1934 Vitaphone short Smoked Hams with Lionel Stander and Daphne Pollard.
Moe and Curly appeared without Healy or Larry in the MGM short subject Jail Birds of Paradise (1934).
Curly appeared in the MGM short subject Roast Beef and Movies (1934) without Healy, Moe, or Larry.
Larry and Healy appeared without Moe or Curly in the MGM feature Stage Mother (1933).
Curly and Healy appeared without Moe or Larry in the MGM feature Operator 13 (1934).

Moe, Larry and Curly left Healy in 1934 and moved to Columbia Pictures to begin their successful series of 190 shorts, with their contract extended each year until the final one expired on December 31, 1957. The final 8 of the 16 shorts with Joe Besser were released afterwards over the next 1⅓ years. The Stooges would continue afterwards with Moe, Larry, and Joe DeRita (as "Curly Joe"), and make several full-length feature films between 1959 and 1970.

Key
AAN = nominated for an Academy Award

 = utilized footage from previous Stooge films

† = currently in public domain

^ = filmed after Curly Howard's initial stroke

^^ = filmed after Shemp Howard's death (see "Fake Shemp")

§ = denotes a cameo appearance or supporting role

~ = television pilot

т = television series

⚐ = short released by Metro-Goldwyn-Mayer



1930 – 1933 – 1934 – 1935 – 1936 – 1937 – 1938 – 1939
1940 – 1941 – 1942 – 1943 – 1944 – 1945 – 1946 – 1947 – 1948 – 1949
1950 – 1951 – 1952 – 1953 – 1954 – 1955 – 1956 – 1957 – 1958 – 1959
1960 – 1961 – 1962 – 1963 – 1965 – 1968
1970

Ted Healy and His Stooges

Moe, Larry and Shemp

1930
  Soup to Nuts (September 28)

Moe, Larry and Curly

1933
 Screen Snapshots Series 13 #5 (May 10)
  The Prizefighter and the Lady (May 27) (scene deleted) §
  Nertsery Rhymes (July 6) ⚐
  Beer and Pretzels (August 26) ⚐
  Hello Pop! (September 16) ⚐
  Plane Nuts (October 14) ⚐
  Meet the Baron (October 20) §
  Dancing Lady (November 24) §
  Myrt and Marge (December 4) §

1934
  Fugitive Lovers (January 5) §
  Hollywood on Parade # B-9 (Mar 30)
  The Big Idea (May 12) ⚐
  Hollywood Party (June 1) §

1964
 MGM's Big Parade of Comedy (September 3) — Compilation movie featuring clips from Hollywood Party.

The Three Stooges: Moe, Larry and Curly (1934–1946)

1933
  Movietone News (May 27)
  Turn Back the Clock (August 25) §

1934
 1 Woman Haters (May 5)
 2 Punch Drunks (July 13)
 3 Men in Black (September 28) AAN
  Screen Snapshots Series 14 #1 (September 29)
  Screen Snapshots Series 14 #2 (October 26)
  The Captain Hates the Sea (November 28) §
 4 Three Little Pigskins (December 8)

1935
 5 Horses' Collars (January 10)
 6 Restless Knights (February 20)
  Screen Snapshots Series 14 #6 (February 22)
 7 Pop Goes the Easel (March 29)
 8 Uncivil Warriors (April 26)
 9 Pardon My Scotch (August 1) (first entry to feature "Listen to the Mocking Bird" as the Stooges' official theme song)
 10 Hoi Polloi (August 29)
 11 Three Little Beers (November 28)

1936
 12 Ants in the Pantry (February 6)
 13 Movie Maniacs (February 20)
  Screen Snapshots Series 15 #7 (February 28)
 14 Half Shot Shooters (April 30)
 15 Disorder in the Court (May 30) †
 16 A Pain in the Pullman (June 27)
 17 False Alarms (August 16)
 18 Whoops, I'm an Indian! (September 11)
 19 Slippery Silks (December 27)

1937
 20 Grips, Grunts and Groans (January 13)
 21 Dizzy Doctors (March 19)
 22 3 Dumb Clucks (April 17)
 23 Back to the Woods (May 14) 
 24 Goofs and Saddles (July 2)
 25 Cash and Carry (September 3)
 26 Playing the Ponies (October 15)
  Surprise, Surprise - Columbia newsreel (October 31)
 27 The Sitter Downers (November 26)

1938
 28 Termites of 1938 (January 7)
 29 Wee Wee Monsieur (February 18)
 Start Cheering (March 3) §
 30 Tassels in the Air (April 1)
 31 Healthy, Wealthy and Dumb (May 20)
 32 Violent is the Word for Curly (July 2)
 33 Three Missing Links (July 29)
 34 Mutts to You (October 14)
 35 Flat Foot Stooges (December 5) (first with "Three Blind Mice" as the Stooges' official theme song)

1939
 36 Three Little Sew and Sews (January 6)
 37 We Want Our Mummy (February 24)
 38 A Ducking They Did Go (April 7) 
  Screen Snapshots Series 18 #9 (May 12)
 39 Yes, We Have No Bonanza (May 19)
 40 Saved by the Belle (June 30)
 41 Calling All Curs (August 25)
 42 Oily to Bed, Oily to Rise (October 6)
 43 Three Sappy People (December 1)

1940
 44 You Nazty Spy! (January 19)
  Screen Snapshots Series 19 #5 (February 23)
 45 Rockin' thru the Rockies (March 8)
  Screen Snapshots Series 19 #6 (March 29)
 46 A Plumbing We Will Go (April 19)
 47 Nutty but Nice (June 14)
 48 How High Is Up? (July 26)
 49 From Nurse to Worse (August 23) 
 50 No Census, No Feeling (October 4)
 51 Cookoo Cavaliers (November 15)
  Screen Snapshots Series 20 #3 (November 22)
 52 Boobs in Arms (December 27)

1941
 53 So Long Mr. Chumps (February 7)
 54 Dutiful But Dumb (March 21)
 55 All the World's a Stooge (May 16)
 Time Out for Rhythm (June 5)
 56 I'll Never Heil Again (July 11)
 57 An Ache in Every Stake (August 22)
 58 In the Sweet Pie and Pie (October 16) 
  Screen Snapshots Series 21 #3 (November 7)
 59 Some More of Samoa (December 4)

1942
 60 Loco Boy Makes Good (January 8)
 61 Cactus Makes Perfect (February 26)
 62 What's the Matador? (April 23)
 63 Matri-Phony (July 2)
 64 Three Smart Saps (July 30)
 65 Even as IOU (September 18)
 My Sister Eileen (September 24) §
 66 Sock-a-Bye Baby (November 13)

1943
 67 They Stooge to Conga (January 1) 
 68 Dizzy Detectives (February 5) 
  Screen Snapshots Series 22 #8 (March 31)
 69 Spook Louder (April 2)
 70 Back from the Front (May 28)
 Good Luck, Mr. Yates (June 29) (scene deleted) §
 71 Three Little Twirps (July 9)
 72 Higher Than a Kite (July 30)
 73 I Can Hardly Wait (August 13)
 74 Dizzy Pilots (September 24) 
 75 Phony Express (November 18)
 76 A Gem of a Jam (December 30)

1944
 77 Crash Goes the Hash (February 4)
 78 Busy Buddies (March 18)
 79 The Yoke's on Me (May 26)
 80 Idle Roomers (July 15)
 81 Gents Without Cents (September 22)
 82 No Dough Boys (November 24)

1945
 83 Three Pests in a Mess (January 19)
 84 Booby Dupes (March 17)
  Screen Snapshots (April)
 Rockin' in the Rockies (April 17) ^
 85 Idiots Deluxe (July 20) ^
 86 If a Body Meets a Body (August 30) ^
 87 Micro-Phonies (November 15) ^

1946
 88 Beer Barrel Polecats (January 10)  ^
 89 A Bird in the Head (February 28) ^
 Swing Parade of 1946 (March 16) ^ †
 90 Uncivil War Birds (March 29) ^ ("Dixie" replaces "Three Blind Mice" as opening theme for this entry)
 91 The Three Troubledoers (April 25) ^
 92 Monkey Businessmen (June 20) ^
 93 Three Loan Wolves (July 4) ^
 94 G.I. Wanna Home (September 5) ^
 95 Rhythm and Weep (October 3) ^
 96 Three Little Pirates (December 5) ^

1947
 97 Half-Wits Holiday (January 9) ^

1960
  Stop! Look! and Laugh! (July 1)

The Three Stooges: Moe, Larry and Shemp (1946–1955)

1947
 98 Fright Night (March 6)
 99 Out West (April 24)
 100 Hold That Lion! (July 17) (Curly Howard in a cameo)
 101 Brideless Groom (September 11) †
 102 Sing a Song of Six Pants (October 30) †
 103 All Gummed Up (December 18)

1948
 104 Shivering Sherlocks (January 8)
 105 Pardon My Clutch (February 26)
 106 Squareheads of the Round Table (March 4)
 107 Fiddlers Three (May 6)
 108 The Hot Scots (July 8)
 109 Heavenly Daze (September 2)
 110 I'm a Monkey's Uncle (October 7)
 111 Mummy's Dummies (November 4)
 112 Crime on Their Hands (December 9)

1949
 113 The Ghost Talks! (February 3)
 114 Who Done It? (March 3)
 115 Hokus Pokus (May 5)
 116 Fuelin' Around (July 7)
 117 Malice in the Palace (September 1) † 
 118 Vagabond Loafers (October 6) 
 Jerks of All Trades (October 12) ~ †
 119 Dunked in the Deep (November 3)

1950
 120 Punchy Cowpunchers (January 5)
 121 Hugs and Mugs (February 2)
 122 Dopey Dicks (March 2)
 123 Love at First Bite (May 4)
 124 Self-Made Maids (July 6)
 125 Three Hams on Rye (September 7)
 126 Studio Stoops (October 5)
 127 Slaphappy Sleuths (November 9)
 128 A Snitch in Time (December 7)

1951
 129 Three Arabian Nuts (January 4)
 130 Baby Sitters Jitters (February 1)
 131 Don't Throw That Knife (May 3)
 132 Scrambled Brains (July 7)
 133 Merry Mavericks (September 6) 
 Gold Raiders (September 9)
 134 The Tooth Will Out (October 4)
 135 Hula-La-La (November 1)
 136 Pest Man Wins (December 6)

1952
 137 A Missed Fortune (January 3) 
 138 Listen, Judge (March 6)
 139 Corny Casanovas (May 1)
 140 He Cooked His Goose (July 3)
 141 Gents in a Jam (July 4)
 142 Three Dark Horses (October 16)
 143 Cuckoo on a Choo Choo (December 4)

1953
 144 Up in Daisy's Penthouse (February 5) 
 145 Booty and the Beast (March 5) 
 146 Loose Loot (April 2) 
 147 Tricky Dicks (May 7) 
 148 Spooks! (June 15) (first flat widescreen short)
 149 Pardon My Backfire (August 15)
 150 Rip, Sew and Stitch (September 3) 
 151 Bubble Trouble (October 8) 
 152 Goof on the Roof (December 3)

1954
 153 Income Tax Sappy (February 4)
 154 Musty Musketeers (May 13) 
 155 Pals and Gals (June 3) 
 156 Knutzy Knights (September 2) 
 157 Shot in the Frontier (October 7)
 158 Scotched in Scotland (November 4)

1955
 159 Fling in the Ring (January 6) 
 160 Of Cash and Hash (February 3) 
 161 Gypped in the Penthouse (March 10)
 162 Bedlam in Paradise (April 14) 
 163 Stone Age Romeos (June 2) 
 164 Wham-Bam-Slam! (September 1) 
 165 Hot Ice (October 6) 
 166 Blunder Boys (November 3)

1956
 167 Husbands Beware (January 5) 
 168 Creeps (February 2) 
 169 Flagpole Jitters (April 5) 
 170 For Crimin' Out Loud (May 3) 
 171 Rumpus in the Harem (June 21)  ^^
 172 Hot Stuff (September 6)  ^^
 173 Scheming Schemers (October 4)  ^^
 174 Commotion on the Ocean (November 8)  ^^

The Three Stooges: Moe, Larry and Joe Besser (1957–1959)

1957
 175 Hoofs and Goofs (January 31)
 176 Muscle Up a Little Closer (February 28)
 177 A Merry Mix Up (March 28)
 178 Space Ship Sappy (April 18)
 179 Guns a Poppin! (June 13) 
 180 Horsing Around (September 12)
 181 Rusty Romeos (October 17) 
 182 Outer Space Jitters (December 5)

1958
 183 Quiz Whizz (February 13)
 184 Fifi Blows Her Top (April 10) 
 185 Pies and Guys (June 12) 
 186 Sweet and Hot (September 4)
 187 Flying Saucer Daffy (October 9)
 188 Oil's Well That Ends Well (December 4)

1959
 189 Triple Crossed (February 2) 
 190 Sappy Bull Fighters (June 4) 
 Three Stooges Fun-O-Rama (September 1)

All 190 Columbia short films were released in the DVD series The Three Stooges Collection. The series includes seven 2-disc volumes and one 3-disc volume. Volume Seven features 3D glasses for the shorts Spooks! and Pardon My Backfire.

The Three Stooges: Larry, Moe and Curly Joe (1959–1970)

1959
 Have Rocket, Will Travel (August 1)
 News of the Day – Days Are Flying 'Til Christmas (MGM newsreel) (December 1)

1960
  The Three Stooges Scrapbook ~

1961
 Fox Movietone News – Return to Peyton Place (May 2)
 Snow White and the Three Stooges (June 21)

1962
 The Three Stooges Meet Hercules (January 26) 
 The Three Stooges in Orbit (July 4)

1963
 The Three Stooges Go Around the World in a Daze (August 21)
 It's a Mad, Mad, Mad, Mad World (November 7) §
 4 for Texas (December 18) §

1965
 The Outlaws IS Coming! (January 14)
 The New 3 Stooges (September 1965 – October 1966) † т

1968
 Star Spangled Salesman (February 9) §

1970
 Kook's Tour (February 5) ~

Feature films

Joe Besser never appeared with the Stooges in a feature film.

Three feature-length Columbia releases were actually packages of older Columbia shorts. Columbia Laff Hour (introduced in 1956) was a random assortment that included the Stooges among other Columbia comedians like Andy Clyde, Hugh Herbert, and Vera Vague; the content and length varied from one theater to the next. Three Stooges Fun-o-Rama (introduced in 1959) was an all-Stooges show capitalizing on their TV fame, again with shorts chosen at random for individual theaters. The Three Stooges Follies (1974) was similar to Laff Hour, with a trio of Stooge comedies augmented by actor, comedian and filmmaker Buster Keaton and Vera Vague shorts, a Batman serial chapter, and a Kate Smith musical.

Solo work

Moe 
 We Must Do Our Best (1908)
 Fish Hookey (1910)
 Give a Man a Job (1933)
 Broadway to Hollywood (1933)
 Jail Birds of Paradise (1934)
 Senior Prom (1958)
 Don't Worry, We'll Think of a Title (1966)
 Doctor Death: Seeker of Souls (1973)

Shemp 
 Convention Girl (1935)
 Hollywood Round-Up (1937)
 Headin' East (1937) 
 Behind Prison Gates (1939)
 Another Thin Man (1939)
 The Lone Wolf Meets a Lady (1939)
 The Leather Pushers (1940)
 Give Us Wings (1940)
 The Bank Dick (1940)
 Murder Over New York (1940) 
 Millionaires in Prison (1940)
 The Invisible Woman (1940) 
 Six Lessons from Madame La Zonga (1941)
 Buck Privates (1941)
 Meet the Chump (1941)
 Road Show (1941)
 Mr. Dynamite (1941)
 The Flame of New Orleans (1941)
 Too Many Blondes (1941)
 In the Navy (1941) 
 Tight Shoes (1941) 
 San Antonio Rose (1941) 
 Hit the Road (1941)
 Cracked Nuts (1941) 
 Hellzapoppin' (1941)
 Butch Minds the Baby (1942)
 The Strange Case of Doctor Rx (1942) 
 Mississippi Gambler (1942)
 Private Buckaroo (1942) 
 Strictly in the Groove (1942)
 Pittsburgh (1942) 
 Arabian Nights (1942)
 How's About It (1942)
 Keep 'Em Slugging (1943) 
 Crazy House (1943)
 Three of a Kind (1943)
 Moonlight and Cactus (1943)
 Strange Affair (1944)
 Crazy Knights (1944)
 Trouble Chasers (1945)
 The Gentleman Misbehaves (1946) 
 One Exciting Week (1946)
 Dangerous Business (1946)
 Blondie Knows Best (1946) 
 Africa Screams (1949)

Curly 
 Broadway to Hollywood (1933)
 Roast Beef and Movies (1934)
 Jail Birds of Paradise (1934)

References

External links
 Threestooges.net
 The Three Stooges Official Website (sanctioned by  C3 Entertainment, Inc.)

American film series
 
Slapstick films
Male actor filmographies
American filmographies